The Old People's Home, presently known as Leo Vaughan Senior Manor, is located at 3325 Fontenelle Boulevard in the Florence neighborhood on the north side of Omaha, Nebraska. Built in 1917, it was listed on the National Register of Historic Places in 1987.

History
The Old People's Home was initiated by the Women's Christian Aid Association, one of Omaha's first private charitable organizations.  Founded in 1883, the women's group raised funds to construct the two-story brick building in 1917. The building was converted from a nonprofit home to a residential retirement center in 1988.

References

External links

Modern photo of the facility.
Historic photos and postcard Nebraska Memories

Residential buildings on the National Register of Historic Places in Nebraska
Residential buildings completed in 1917
History of North Omaha, Nebraska
Buildings and structures in Omaha, Nebraska
National Register of Historic Places in Omaha, Nebraska
1917 establishments in Nebraska